Mirabelle most often refers to a type of small, yellow prune.

Mirabelle may also refer to:
Mirabelle (name), feminine given name
 Mirabelle (Breda restaurant) - Dutch restaurant
 Mirabelle (London restaurant) - English restaurant

See also
Mirabel (disambiguation)